is a passenger railway station in located in the city of Higashiōmi,  Shiga Prefecture, Japan, operated by the private railway operator Ohmi Railway. The Tōkaidō Shinkansen passes over just south of Gokashō Station.

Lines
Gokashō Station is served by the Ohmi Railway Main Line, and is located 20.9 rail kilometers from the terminus of the line at Maibara Station.

Station layout
The station consists of two unnumbered side platforms connected to the station building by a level crossing.

Platforms

Adjacent stations

History
It was relocated 200 meters to the south and renamed to its present name on January 1, 1900.. The station building was reconstructed in 2000.

Passenger statistics
In fiscal 2019, the station was used by an average of 84 passengers daily (boarding passengers only).

Surroundings
 Higashiomi City Hall Gokashō Branch
 Higashiomi City Gokashō Welfare Center
 Higashiomi City Gokashō Health Center
 Higashiomi Municipal Gokashō Junior High School

See also
List of railway stations in Japan

References

External links

 Ohmi Railway official site 

Railway stations in Japan opened in 1899
Railway stations in Shiga Prefecture
Higashiōmi